Tuyul & Mbak Yul Reborn is an Indonesian soap opera produced by Tripar Multivision Plus. It first aired on ANTV on September 25, 2016.

The comedy film based on Tuyul & Mbak Yul: Reborn series originally planned in 2019 by Tripar Multivison Plus, due to the COVID-19 pandemic in 2020, the Tuyul & Mbak Yul The Movie shooting had to be temporarily canceled.

Synopsis 
Ucil (Megi Irawan) who chose to retire took the money man. In his flight from King Toyol, Ucil saved by Yuli alias Mbak Yul (Pamela Bowie). Ucil pursued two executioners, but have friends who protect her, Kentung (Rony Dozer). Rocky (Stuart Collin) were chatty and jealous.

Cast 
 Megi Irawan as Ucil
  as Yulia
  as Rocky
  as Asep
  as Kenting
  as Kentung
  as Ibu Guru
  as Aji
  as Jessy
 Sayudi as Ucul
 Mueng Engingeng as Ocol
 Nesya Chandria as Laras
  as Radit
 Naguita Aurora as Mimi
 Arzenda as Udin
 Boim Imoet as Mr. Raja Tuyul

Guest stars 
 Bhavesh Balchandani
 Harshita Ojha
 Vaishali Thakkar 
 Ruhanika Dhawan
 Faisal Khan
 Mrunal Thakur
 Shakti Arora

References

External links 
 

Indonesian television soap operas
2016 Indonesian television series debuts